Mikael Kristian Gabriel Sohlman (born 25 February 1990), professionally known as Mikael Gabriel or MG, is a Finnish rapper. He has released six solo albums and appeared as a featured guest on songs by artists such as Cheek, Lord Est, Robin and Uniikki. In 2016 Mikael Gabriel made his acting debut in a horror film Bodom, inspired by the 1960 Lake Bodom murders, and also appeared in the Antti Jokinen film Pahan kukat. He participated in the fifth season of the music reality television series Vain elämää and was one of the judges on the second season of the Finnish version of X Factor in 2018.

Mikael Gabriel's father was a Swedish-speaking Finn and mother, Liidia, is Estonian. His mother raised him as a single parent and he did not meet his father until he was in his teens.

Selected discography

Albums

Singles
As lead artist

As featured artist

References

1990 births
Living people
Musicians from Helsinki
Finnish people of Estonian descent
Finnish rappers